Kappes is a surname. Notable people with the surname include:

Andreas Kappes (1965–2018), German cyclist
Anthony Kappes (born 1973), British road and track racing cyclist
Bob Kappes, American football player and coach
Stephen Kappes (born 1951), American intelligence official